In Greek mythology, Megaclite was the daughter of Macareus, king of Locris and possibly the sister of Euboea. She was the mother of Thebe and Locrus by Zeus.

Notes

References 

 Gaius Julius Hyginus, Fabulae from The Myths of Hyginus translated and edited by Mary Grant. University of Kansas Publications in Humanistic Studies. Online version at the Topos Text Project.
 Pseudo-Clement, Recognitions from Ante-Nicene Library Volume 8, translated by Smith, Rev. Thomas. T. & T. Clark, Edinburgh. 1867. Online version at theio.com

Children of Zeus
Demigods in classical mythology
Locrian characters in Greek mythology